Stilpnophyllum is a genus of flowering plants in the family Rubiaceae. They are shrubs and trees native to South America. They occur in wet forest habitat.

Species include:
Stilpnophyllum grandifolium
Stilpnophyllum lineatum
Stilpnophyllum oellgaardii
Stilpnophyllum revolutum

References 

 
Rubiaceae genera
Taxonomy articles created by Polbot